Hansjörg Baltes (born 11 August 1964) is a German speed skater. He competed at the 1984 Winter Olympics and the 1988 Winter Olympics.

References

1964 births
Living people
German male speed skaters
Olympic speed skaters of West Germany
Speed skaters at the 1984 Winter Olympics
Speed skaters at the 1988 Winter Olympics
Sportspeople from Munich